Julie Hoomans is a Dutch fashion model.

Career
Hoomans was discovered while going shopping. She debuted at Prada S/S 2014, and walked for Altuzarra, Versace, Anthony Vaccarello, Dries Van Noten, and Maison Margiela. She has also walked for Louis Vuitton, Prada, Chanel, Gucci, Celine, Valentino, Carolina Herrera, Marni, Kenzo, Alexander McQueen, Mugler, Dior, Nina Ricci, Tommy Hilfiger, Christopher Kane, and many more. 

Models.com chose her as one of the "Top Newcomers" of 2015. At the age of 19, she had already walked over 260 fashion shows. In 2018, Vogue reported that Hoomans would take a step back from modelling, to start studying at the University of Amsterdam. In 2020, Hoomans returned to full-time modeling, after graduating summa cum laude in Biomedical Sciences at Amsterdam University College.

References 

1997 births
Living people
People from North Brabant
Dutch female models